Nowshera Virkan is a town and a tehsil situated to the west of the industrial city of Gujranwala, Punjab, Pakistan. Nowshera Virkan is a hub of rice-growing villages.

History
Nowshera Virkan has been a center of political activities from its earliest days. It was dominated by Rajput, Jutt, Arain, and Syed families. It is located in the Gujranwala District and is one of the largest of the four tehsils (administrative divisions). It lies between three large cities: Gujranwala, Hafizabad, and Sheikhupura. The dominant surnames of the Nowshera Virkan people are from military castes, including Bhuttah, Maan, Rajput, Virk & Syed.

Elections 
Ch Ijaz Khan was one of the most influential and popular leaders of this region in the twentieth century. He was elected four times as a Member of the National Assembly (MNA) from this region and was affiliated with the Pakistan Muslim League (N). After his death, his son Chaudhry Bilal Ijaz was elected MNA at age 25 in 2002 from Pakistan Muslim League (Q), defeating Hamid Nasir Chattha. Later in 2008, Mudassir Qayyum Nahra, a Member of the Provincial Assembly (MPA) from PP-102 in 2002–2008, won the seat, but was disqualified and jailed in 2010 for bearing a fake degree. In the 2010 by-elections, Chaudry Tussadiq Masud Khan (Pakistan Peoples Party), a relative of Bilal Ijaz and a member of the Rajput family, was elected as MNA. In 2013 and 2018, Azhar Qayyum Nahra (PMLN), brother of Mudassir Nahra, won the seat, due to PMLN's overall stronghold in Gujranwala region. Bilal Ijaz contested both 2013 and 2018 elections on PTI (Pakistan Tehreek-e-Insaf) ticket but was unsuccessful. The Nahra family is facing charges from the National Accountability Bureau (NAB) for bearing assets beyond income sources.

Towns
Nowshera Virkan Tehsil has many small Towns like Jago Wala New, Tatly Aali,Nokhar,Kot Ladha,Jalhan,Bhiri Shah Rahman,Majo Chak,Karyal kalan

References

Cities and towns in Gujranwala District
Tehsils of Punjab, Pakistan